The 1896 Minnesota gubernatorial election took place on November 3, 1896. Republican Party of Minnesota incumbent David Marston Clough narrowly defeated Democratic Party of Minnesota challenger John Lind. Lind later won the 1898 gubernatorial election and became the first Democrat elected to the office of Governor of Minnesota since Henry Hastings Sibley left office in 1860. 1896 was the first of three successive elections in which Lind ran for governor at the head of a coalition consisting of the Democratic Party and the majority faction of the People's Party.

Results

See also
 List of Minnesota gubernatorial elections

External links
 http://www.sos.state.mn.us/home/index.asp?page=653
 http://www.sos.state.mn.us/home/index.asp?page=657

Minnesota
Gubernatorial
1896
November 1896 events